Try Me is a digitally-released album by Rosie Gaines. The album is an alternate version of the then-unreleased Concrete Jungle album, which Rosie reworked in the aftermath of the closing of Paisley Park Records. The album was eventually was released the following year on Motown Records as Closer Than Close. The original "Try Me" sessions was not released until the mid-2000s on digital platforms.

Track listing
All tracks written by Rosie Gaines except where noted.
 "Try Me" – 4:45
 "B.I.T.C.H." – 4:35
 "In the Middle of a Garden" – 4:51
 "Ooh La La" – 4:41
 "In the Socket" (Gaines, Prince) – 3:56 
 "Lost in the Wilderness" – 3:14
 "Do What You Wanna Do" (Gaines, Francis Jules, Francis Richardson) – 5:45 
 "Swing Hard" (Gaines, Dana Bailey) – 2:48 
 "Crazy Mutha Funky" – 3:42
 "The Greatest Touch" – 3:11
 "Play That Beat" – 3:24
 "Jah Love" – 3:52
 "The People of Today" (Gaines, Francis Richardson) – 1:32 
 "(Everything I Do) I Do It for You" (Bryan Adams, Michael Kamen, Robert John "Mutt" Lange)– 4:27

External links
 Official Try Me album page

Rosie Gaines albums
1990 albums